Aragatsotn is a village in the Ashtarak Municipality of the Aragatsotn Province of Armenia. Aragatsotn was a former sovkhoz (collective farm), founded in 1971.

References 

Report of the results of the 2001 Armenian Census
Kiesling, Rediscovering Armenia, p. 17, available online at the US embassy to Armenia's website

Populated places in Aragatsotn Province
Populated places established in 1971
Cities and towns built in the Soviet Union
1971 establishments in the Soviet Union